Yoshito is a masculine Japanese given name.

Possible writings
Yoshito can be written using different combinations of kanji characters. Here are some examples: 

義人, "justice, person"
儀人, "ceremony, person"
佳人, "good, person"
嘉人, "auspicious, person"
好人, "pleasing, person"
吉人, "good luck, person"
吉斗, "good luck, Big Dipper"
芳人, "fragrant/virtuous, person"
善人, "virtuous, person"
良人, "good, person"
能人, "capacity, person"
由人, "reason, person"
与志人, "give, determination, person"
禎人, "blessed, person"
禎斗, "blessed, Big Dipper"

The name can also be written in hiragana よしと or katakana ヨシト.

Notable people with the name

 Yoshito Higuchi (樋口 義人), Japanese video game producer
, Japanese chemist
, Japanese photojournalist
, Japanese footballer
, Japanese politician
, Japanese wrestler
 Yoshito Takamine (1924 – 2015), Japanese-American politician
, Japanese footballer
, Japanese manga artist
, Japanese manga artist
, Japanese voice actor

Japanese masculine given names